The 1904 Oregon Agricultural Aggies football team represented Oregon Agricultural College (now known as Oregon State University) as an independent during the 1904 college football season. In their first season under head coach Allen Steckle, the Aggies compiled a 4–2 record and outscored their opponents by a combined total of 119 to 22. The Aggies defeated Washington (26–5) and Utah State (45–0), and lost to Oregon (5–6), and the Multnomah Athletic Club (10–11). Bert Pilkington was the team captain.

Schedule

References

Oregon Agricultural
Oregon State Beavers football seasons
Oregon Agricultural Aggies football